Ana María Hernández Salgar (born 1972) is a Colombian professional in international relations. She is currently the Head of Office International Affairs, Policy and Cooperation at the Alexander von Humboldt Biological Resources Research Institute.

On May 6, 2019, she was appointed as the chair of the Intergovernmental Platform on Biodiversity and Ecosystem Services (IPBES)., the IPCC of biodiversity. She replaced the outgoing chair, Robert Watson. As the newly elected chair of IPBES, she did an interview with RCN Radio on the 2019 IPBES Report on threats to biodiversity.

External links 
IPBES

1972 births
Colombian women
Living people

References